Tua is a river in northeastern Portugal, flowing by the border of Vila Real District and Bragança District. It is a tributary of the Douro River. The biggest and most important city it flows through is Mirandela.

The Tua line was a narrow gauge railway which closely followed the banks of the river and was closed in 2008.

In 2017 the Foz Tua project, which includes a dam built near the mouth of the Tua River (at the confluence with the Douro River), started producing energy, after a long controversial process between Portuguese government and environmental organizations.

References

Rivers of Portugal
Tributaries of the Douro River